Arevalillo is a municipality located in the province of Ávila, Castile and León, Spain. According to the 2004 census (INE), the municipality had a population of 120 inhabitants.

References

External links
 A window to Arevalillo

Municipalities in the Province of Ávila